Brundage is an English habitational surname originating from the English village of Brundish. It may refer to the following notable people:

Amanda Brundage (born 1991), American mixed martial artist 
 Avery Brundage (1887–1975), American sports administrator 
Cody Brundage (born 1994), American mixed martial artist, husband of Amanda
Dave Brundage (born 1964), American professional baseball manager
Dewey Brundage (1931–2022), American professional football player 
 Edward J. Brundage (1869–1934), American lawyer and politician
 Frances Brundage (1854–1937), American illustrator 
 Jackson Brundage (born 2001), American actor
James A. Brundage (1929–2021), American historian
 Jennifer Brundage (born 1973), American softball player 
 Margaret Brundage (1900–1976), American illustrator and painter
 Mathilde Brundage (1859–1939), American actress
 Percival Brundage (1892–1979), American accountant 
 Slim Brundage (1903–1990), American anarchist
 W. Fitzhugh Brundage, American historian

References

English-language surnames